Walter Dutton Powdrell (1872 – 9 March 1921) was a Reform Party Member of Parliament in New Zealand.

Powdrell was born in Wairoa in 1872.
 
He won the Patea electorate in 1919, and held it until he died in 1921. According to the Coroner's Report into the death, Powdrell fell from a building on 9 March 1921. The fall caused injuries to the spine, which led to death later in the day. The coroner decreed that "whether death was accident or design, there was no evidence."

References

1872 births
1921 deaths
Reform Party (New Zealand) MPs
Members of the New Zealand House of Representatives
New Zealand MPs for North Island electorates
People from Wairoa